Marie-Jeanne Brillant (1724–1775), was a French stage actress.

She was engaged at the Comédie-Française in 1750.

She became a Sociétaires of the Comédie-Française in 1750.

She retired in 1767.

References

External links 
  Marie-Jeanne Brillant, Comédie-Française

1724 births
1775 deaths
18th-century French actresses
French stage actresses